Tse Wing Kin (謝榮鍵) (born 19 January 1979), also known as Kevin Tse, is a Hong Kong-born Macanese racing driver currently competing in the British GT Championship with Sky Tempesta Racing.

Racing career
Tse began his career in 2009 in the ADAC Volkswagen Polo Cup. He switched to the Chinese Volkswagen Scirocco Cup in 2010, finishing second in the championship standings that year. He also raced a couple of races in the GT Asia Series that season. He switched to the Macau AAMC Roadsport Series in 2011 and won the title that year. For 2012 he switched to the Lamborghini Super Trofeo Asia, finishing second in the championship that year. He also took part in the 2012 Dubai 24 Hour, finishing fifth in the A2 class, while also making a one-off appearance in the Audi R8 LMS Cup that year. He switched to the Porsche Carrera Cup Asia for 2013 finishing third in the B class at 2012 Macau Grand Prix. For 2014 he switched to the Asian Le Mans Series, winning the CN class that season. In 2015 he raced in the Clio Cup China Series and the CTM Macau Touring Car Cup finishing fourteenth and eleventh in the two championships respectively. He switched to the TCR Asia Series for 2016, joining the series with TeamWork Motorsport.

In September 2016 it was announced that he would race in the TCR International Series, driving a Volkswagen Golf GTI TCR for TeamWork Motorsport.

Racing record

Complete TCR International Series results
(key) (Races in bold indicate pole position) (Races in italics indicate fastest lap)

Complete World Touring Car Cup results
(key) (Races in bold indicate pole position) (Races in italics indicate fastest lap)

TCR Spa 500 results

References

External links
 

1979 births
Living people
TCR International Series drivers
TCR Asia Series drivers
Macau racing drivers
Hong Kong emigrants to Macau
World Touring Car Cup drivers
24H Series drivers
Asian Le Mans Series drivers
Mercedes-AMG Motorsport drivers
Craft-Bamboo Racing drivers